The 2015 Western Athletic Conference softball tournament will be held at the New Mexico State softball complex on the campus of New Mexico State University in Las Cruces, New Mexico from May 7 through May 9, 2015.  The tournament winner will earn the Western Athletic Conference's automatic bid to the 2015 NCAA Division I softball tournament. All games will be streamed online on the WAC Digital Network with Danny Mata, sports director of KVIA providing the call.

Tournament

All times listed are Mountain Daylight Time.

References

Western Athletic Conference Tournament
Western Athletic Conference softball tournament
2015 in sports in New Mexico